Asmodee is a French publisher of board games, card games and role-playing games (RPGs). Founded in 1995 to develop their own games and to publish and distribute for other smaller game developers, they have since acquired numerous other board game publishers. A division, Twin Sails Interactive (formerly Asmodee Digital), publishes video game adaptations of Asmodee games.

History
Asmodee was founded in 1995 by Marc Nunès, with the idea to not only develop their own board games but to reach out to other smaller publishers of board games and offer to publish and distribute for them, primarily in France. One of the company's early successes was Jungle Speed, which they acquired in 1998 and promoted heavily to various toy stores and retail outlets in France, selling over 4 million copies. In 2003, the company obtained the rights to publish the French version of the Pokémon Trading Card Game, which further helped in their sales outreach. Around 2007, Nunès directed Asmodee towards the European and international market. The company gained a 40% investment from Montefiore Investment, which helped them acquire additional small publishers. Acquisitions during this period include Esdevium, the largest hobby games distributor in the UK, in 2010.

Under Eurazeo's ownership, Asmodée became more active in its acquisitions of other board game publishers and developers. Asmodee currently distributes games under the imprints Descartes Editeur and Eurogames, acquired when they purchased Descartes. However, they have not used these imprints for any original publications since the purchase.

In August 2014, Asmodee agreed to a merger with American board game publishers Days of Wonder. Later that year, they also merged with Fantasy Flight Games. In January 2016, Asmodee acquired the English language rights to the Catan games from Mayfair Games, creating a new company Catan Studio, Inc..

Asmodee launched the book publisher Aconyte in 2020 to publish tie-in works. The company acquired Board Game Arena, a digital tabletop simulator, in February 2021, for which they plan to adapt their games to add to its available library. 

In September 2021, PAI Partners announced that Asmodee was up for sale for 2 billion euros. Embracer Group in December 2021 launched a takeover bid for €2.75 billion, which would make it a ninth operating group within Embracer. During this announcement, they also revealed acquiring the online retail site Miniature Market sometime in 2021. Embracer Group officially completed its takeover of Asmodee on 8 March 2022.

Twin Sails Interactive 
In addition to its physical publishing rights, Asmodee began developing video games based on their board game properties for personal computers and mobile gaming. Many of these games were built atop the software libraries that Days of Wonder had crafted for their digital version of Ticket to Ride. As of January 2017, the company had published digital versions of Mysterium and Potion Explosion in addition to existing titles published by their acquired companies. Philippe Dao, the chief marketing officer for Asmodee Digital, stated that they anticipated to have 20 more games out by the end of 2017.

In October 2017, Asmodee and Fantasy Flight announced the formation of Fantasy Flight Interactive, a division of the merged companies to bring more of Fantasy Flight's physical board games to digital implementations. Among the games, developed by the studio were The Lord of the Rings: Adventure Card Game and The Lord of the Rings: Journeys in Middle-earth. However, as part of company-wide layoffs, the Fantasy Flight Interactive division was closed down in January 2020 and the mobile version of The Lord of the Rings: Adventure Card Game was never released. Following the closure of Fantasy Flight Interactive, by February 2020, Asmodee announced that it was opening up its library of board games to be made into digital versions through licensing options to any developer. On 11 February 2021, Asmodee announced acquisition of digital multiplayer board game platform, Board Game Arena. Asmodee Digital was rebranded as Twin Sails Interactive in August 2022.

Products
Games published by Asmodée include:

 7 Wonders
 Carcassonne
 Catan
 Citadels
 Diplomacy
 Dixit
 Dobble
 Formula De
 Hanabi
 Jaipur
 Jungle Speed
 Liar's Dice
 Pandemic
 Splendor
 Star Wars: X-Wing Miniatures Game
 The Werewolves of Millers Hollow
 Ticket to Ride
 Time's Up!

Subsidiaries

 Access+
 Aconyte
 Atomic Mass Games
 Bezzerwizzer Studio
 Catan Studio
 Days of Wonder
 Edge Entertainment
 Exploding Kittens
 Fantasy Flight Games
 Gamegenic
 Libellud
 Lookout Games
 Mixlore
 Pearl Games
 Plan B Games
 Rebel Studio
 Repos Production
 Space Cow
 Space Cowboys
 The Green Board Game Co.
 Unexpected Games
 Z-Man Games
 Zygomatic Games

References

External links 
 
  official (original) website 
 Asmodee Bio on BoardgameGeek website

Board game publishing companies
Card game publishing companies
Role-playing game publishing companies
Publishing companies established in 1995
French companies established in 1995
PAI Partners companies
2022 mergers and acquisitions
Embracer Group
Companies based in Île-de-France